Thomas Maynard Good (born December 23, 1944) is a former professional American football linebacker. He played one season with the San Diego Chargers of the American Football League (AFL). He played college football at Marshall.

At Marshall, Good was a team captain on the 1965 team. In 1984, Good was inducted into the Marshall University Athletics Hall of Fame.

Good was drafted by the AFL's Chargers and the NFL's New York Giants but opted to sign with the Chargers in 1966. After playing one season with the Chargers, Good played for the Charleston Rockets of the Continental Football League.

References

1944 births
Living people
American football linebackers
Continental Football League players
Marshall Thundering Herd football players
People from South Charleston, West Virginia
Players of American football from West Virginia
San Diego Chargers players